Cape Hodgson is the northernmost cape of Black Island, in the Ross Archipelago, Antarctica. It was named by the New Zealand Geological Survey Antarctic Expedition (1958–59) for Thomas V. Hodgson, a biologist with the British National Antarctic Expedition (1901–04), who with Reginald Koettlitz, Hartley T. Ferrar and Louis Bernacchi was the first to visit the island.

References

Headlands of the Ross Dependency
Black Island (Ross Archipelago)